Albert Edward Weir was a Northern Irish footballer who played for Belfast Celtic from 1926 to 1929.

External links 
 One of Ned Weirs Caps at the  Granddaughter Sharon Gilfillans Northern Ireland Supporters website

Association footballers from Northern Ireland
Year of birth missing
Year of death missing
Association footballers from Belfast
Belfast Celtic F.C. players
Dundalk F.C. players
League of Ireland players
Coleraine F.C. players
Brantwood F.C. players
Association footballers not categorized by position